Cowbawn  is a townland in the Barony of Ormond Lower, County Tipperary, Ireland. It is located north of Cloughjordan.

References

Townlands of County Tipperary